Nicolas Perignon or Pérignon, also known as Alexis-Nicolas Perignon, the Elder (1726 – 4 January 1782), was a French painter, draughtsman, and engraver. He specialized in portraits, rustic scenes, landscapes, and seascapes.

Perignon was born in Nancy and died in Paris. He travelled to Italy and Switzerland, creating numerous drawings, which he later reproduced as engravings. Perignon was made a member of the Académie Royale de Peinture et de Sculpture in 1774 and exhibited mostly gouaches of country scenes at the Paris Salons of 1775, 1779, and 1781. According to Benezit, "his work is sought after."

Gallery

Notes

Bibliography
 Baur, J. (1990). Procès-verbaux de l'Académie royale de peinture et de sculpture, 1648-1793, Volume 9 (1780–1788). Paris: Charavay frères. Copy at Google Books.
 Benezit Dictionary of Artists (2006), vol. 10, pp. 1171–1172 ("Perignon, Alexis Nicolas, the Elder"). Paris: Gründ. .
 Montaiglon, Anatole de (1888). Procès-verbaux de l'Académie royale de peinture et de sculpture, 1648-1793, Volume 8 (1769–1779). Paris: Charavay frères. Copy at Google Books.
 Witt Library (2014). ("PERIGNON, Nicolas") in A Checklist of Painters c1200-1976 represented in the Witt Library, Courtauld Institute of Art, London, second edition, p. 396. New York: Routledge. .

1726 births
1782 deaths
Artists from Nancy, France
18th-century French painters
French male painters
French draughtsmen
18th-century French engravers
Members of the Académie royale de peinture et de sculpture
18th-century French male artists